The Simurrum Kingdom (: Si-mu-ur-ri-im) was an important city state of the Mesopotamian area from around 2000 BCE to 1500 BCE, during the period of the Akkadian Empire down to Ur III. The Simurrum Kingdom disappears from records after the Old Babylonian period. It was neighbour and sometimes ally with the Lullubi kingdom.  It has been proposed that the city was on the Sirwan River (in Iran) which becomes the Diyala river in Iraq.

Kingdom

The Simurrum Kingdom seems to have been part of a belt of Hurrian city states in the northeastern portion of Mesopotamian area. They were often in conflict with the rulers of Ur III.

Several Kings (𒈗, pronounced  Šàr, "Shar", in Akkadian) of Simurrum are known, such as Iddin-Sin and his son Zabazuna. Various inscriptions suggest that they were contemporary with king Ishbi-Erra (1953—c.1920 BCE). Another king, mentioned in The Great Revolt against Narām-Sîn, was mPu-ut-ti-ma-da-al.

Conflicts
Several inscriptions suggest that Simurrum was quite powerful, and shed some light on the conflicts around the Zagros area, another such example being the Anubanini rock relief of the nearby Lullubi Kingdom. Four inscriptions and a relief (now in the Israel Museum) of the Simurrum have been identified at Bitwata near Ranya in Iraq, and one from Sarpol-e Zahab in Iran.

The Simurrun were regularly in conflict with the Akkadian Empire. The names of four years of the reign of Sargon of Akkad describe his campaigns against Elam, Mari, Simurrum, and Uru'a (an Elamite city-state): 

One unknown year during the reign of Akkadian Empire king Naram-Sin of Akkad was recorded as "the Year when Naram-Sin was victorious against Simurrum in Kirasheniwe and took prisoner Baba the governor of Simurrum, and Dubul the ensi (ruler) of Arame".

After the Akkadian Empire fell to the Gutians, the Lullubians and the Simurrums rebelled against the Gutian ruler Erridupizir, according to the latter's inscriptions:

 At one point, Simurrum may have become a vassal of the Gutians. 

The Ur III empire was frequently in conflict with the city. A year name of the second ruler, Shulgi, was "Year Simurrum and Lullubum were destroyed for the ninth time". In one of these conflicts Shulgi captured the ruler of Sumurrum, Tabban-darah, and sent him to exile in Drehem. Sillus-Dagan is known to have been a governor of Simurrum under Ur III. Military strugles continues up to the time of the final ruler of Ur III, Ibbi-Sin.
Simurrum seems to have become independent after the collapse of Ur III.

Gallery

See also 

 Anobanini rock relief

References

External links
 Ancient History.The Secret History of Iddi-Sin’s Stela

Ancient Mesopotamia